Úrvalsdeild karla (English: Men's Premier League), also known as Subway deildin for sponsorship reasons, is the highest men's professional basketball competition among clubs in Iceland, where play determines the national champion. It is organized by the Icelandic Basketball Federation.
The season consists of a home-and-away schedule of 22 games, followed by an eight-team playoff round. Quarterfinals, semifinals and finals series are best-of-five. The bottom clubs are relegated, and replaced by the top team from the regular-season phase and the four-team playoff round winner of the second-level First Division.

History

Creation and first years 1951-1959
The league was founded in 1951 as 1. deild karla  and its first season was played in April 1952 with five teams, Íþróttafélag Keflavíkurflugvallar (ÍKF), Íþróttafélag Reykjavíkur (ÍR), Íþróttafélag Stúdenta (ÍS), Gosi and Glímufélagið Ármann, participating. The team of ÍKF had the advantage of its close proximity with the US Naval Air Station at Keflavík International Airport and therefore could play competitive games with American players who had high school and college experience. They were furthermore coached by two American naval personnel, Gene Crowley and John Wahl. During the tournament, ÍKF won all four of its games with an average of 10.8 points.

For the first years decade the league was dominated by ÍKF (with 4 wins) and ÍR (with 3 wins); with ÍS finally breaking their dominance in 1959.

ÍR's dominance and the arrival of the Americans 1960-1980
From 1960 to 1964, ÍR, under the leadership of Helgi Jóhannsson, won five straight championships followed by KR winning four straight. From 1969 to 1977, ÍR added seven championships in 9 years. Its last victory in 1977 marked an end of an era and the rise of the Suðurnes rivals Keflavík and Njarðvík.

In September 1975, Jimmy Rogers became the first foreign born professional basketball player in Iceland when he signed a three-month contract with Ármann in preparations for their games against Honka Playboys in the FIBA European Cup Winners' Cup. Shortly later, KR signed fellow American Curtis Carter who immediately caught the attention of the fans and media with his powerful play and dunks. Together, they were credited for revolutionizing the Icelandic basketball scene. More Americans followed, including Rick Hockenos, Tim Dwyer and Danny Shouse.

Njarðvík's leadership
The next two decades, exactly from 1980–81 season to the 1997–98 season, Njarðvík (known as ÍKF until 1969) lead the league with 10 wins. In the same period, Keflavík won 4 titles and the KR won their eighth title.

Modern era
From the 2000–01 season, many teams have divided the lead of the league. In the 2005–06 season, the Njarðvík won their thirteenth title. In the following season, the 2006–07 season, the KR won their tenth title and one more year later, in the 2007–08 season, the Keflavík won their ninth title.

Teams
The Úrvalsdeild karla originated in 1951 and, currently, consists of 12 teams. The current Úrvalsdeild karla teams for the 2021–22 season are:

Champions

Notes

Titles per club

ÍKF merged into Ungmennafélag Njarðvíkur in 1969 and became its basketball subdivision. It is today known as Njarðvík. The club won 4 titles under the ÍKF name and added 13 more after the merger

Statistical leaders
The league has kept scoring stats since adopting the Úrvalsdeild karla name in 1978. During the 1988–1989 season, it added more categories, including rebounds, assists and steals and prior to the 1994–1995 season it added blocks.

Úrvalsdeild karla all-time scoring leaders
Player nationality set by the player's national team affiliation. In bold, active players.

Stats through end of 2018–19 Úrvalsdeild karla season:

Úrvalsdeild karla all-time rebounding leaders
Player nationality set by the player's national team affiliation. In bold, active players.

Stats through the end of the 2020–21 Úrvalsdeild karla season:

1 Statistics for rebounds where not kept during Guðmundur's first season. Overall, he played 348 games in the Úrvalsdeild.

Úrvalsdeild karla all-time assists leaders
Player nationality set by the player's national team affiliation. In bold, active players.

Stats through the end of the 2020–21 Úrvalsdeild karla season:

1 Assists where not counted during Jón Kr. Gíslason's first five seasons where he played 93 games.

Awards and honors

Domestic All-First Team

The Men's Domestic All-First Team is an annual Úrvalsdeild honor bestowed on the best players in the league following every season.

Domestic Player of the Year

Foreign Player of the Year

Úrvalsdeild Men's Playoffs MVP

Úrvalsdeild Playoffs MVP award is awarded annually to the player judged most valuable to his team during the Úrvalsdeild playoffs.

Defensive Player of the Year

Newcomer of the Year

Coach of the Year

See also
Icelandic Men's Basketball Cup 
Úrvalsdeild karla (disambiguation)
Úrvalsdeild kvenna (basketball), the women's basketball league

References

External links
KKÍ
Iceland Express deildin karla - kki.is
EUROBasket - Icelandic Basketball
EUROBasket - Express League

 
1951 establishments in Iceland
1
Basketball leagues in Europe
Professional sports leagues in Iceland